This is a list of statistics and records of the Romanian professional football club FC Vaslui. It is based in Vaslui, Romania, and currently plays in Liga IV. The club was founded in 2002 and its home ground is the Municipal Stadium.

Honours
FC Vaslui succeeded three league runners-up, two in the lower divisions and one in Liga I in the 2011–12 season. In 2010, Vaslui reached the Romanian Cup final, lost at the penalty shootout. Vaslui's highest European performance is winning the UEFA Intertoto Cup in 2008.

Domestic

Liga I:
Runner-up (1): 2011–12

Liga II:
Winners (1): 2004–05
Runner-up (1): 2003–04

Liga III:
Runner-up (1): 2002–03

Romanian Cup:
Runner-up (1): 2009–10

European

UEFA Intertoto Cup:

Winners (1): 2008

Player records

Appearances
Mike Temwanjera holds FC Vaslui's appearance record, having played 201 times over the course of 6 seasons from 2007 until now. He also holds the records for most European appearances, having made 17, but also the record for the most league appearances, with 173. Also, Wesley Lopes holds Romanian Cup appearances, with 14.

Most appearances in all competitions: Mike Temwanjera, 202.
Most league appearances: Mike Temwanjera, 174.
Most Romanian Cup appearances: Wesley Lopes, 14.
Most European appearances: Mike Temwanjera 17.
Youngest first-team player: Rareș Lazăr, 15 years and 47 days (against Ceahlăul Piatra Neamţ, 17 May 2014).
Oldest first-team player: Dorinel Munteanu, 39 years and 158 days (against Rapid București, 1 December 2007).
Oldest debutant: Dorinel Munteanu, 39 years and 32 days (against UTA Arad, 27 July 2007).
Most consecutive league appearances: Cristian Hăisan, 59 (from 30 September 2006 to 7 May 2007).
Most seasons as an ever-present: Bogdan Buhuş, 5 (from 2005–06 to 2009–10).
Longest-serving player: Cristian Hăisan, 8 years (from 2002 to 2010).

Most appearances

Most appearances in Liga I

Goalscorers
FC Vaslui's all-time leading scorer is Wesley Lopes, who scored 77 goals between 2009 until 2012. He also holds the record for most league goals with 61, for the most goals in European competition with 6, for the most goals in Romanian Cup with 10, but also the record for the most goals in a season with 37 in all competitions in the 2011–12 season.

Most goals in all competitions: Wesley Lopes, 77.
Most league goals: Wesley Lopes, 61.
Most Romanian Cup goals: Wesley Lopes, 10.
Most European goals: Wesley Lopes, 6.
Most goals in a season: Wesley Lopes, 37 (during the 2011–12 season).
Most hat-tricks in a season: Wesley Lopes, 3 (during the 2011–12 season).
Most hat-tricks: Wesley Lopes, 4.
Fastest hat-trick: Cătălin Andruş, 5 minutes (against CFR Paşcani, 12 October 2002).
Most consecutive league goals scored at Municipal: Marko Ljubinković, 5 during the 2007–08 season.
Highest-scoring substitute: Valentin Badea, 3.
Most penalties scored: Wesley Lopes, 15.
Most games without scoring for an outfield player: Bogdan Buhuş, 125.
Youngest goalscorer: Sorin Ungurianu, 18 years, 328 days (against Laminorul Roman, 8 May 2004).
Oldest goalscorer: Adaílton, 35 years, 104 days (against Gaz Metan Mediaş, 7 May 2012).

Top goalscorers

Top goalscorers in Liga I

Historical goals

In Liga I

All-time

Most captained

International
First capped player: Viorel Frunză, for Moldova on 7 October 2006.
Most international caps while a FC Vaslui player: Denis Zmeu, 20 for Moldova.
Most international goals while a FC Vaslui player: Denis Zmeu, 1 for Moldova
First international participating at a WC: Dušan Kuciak, with Slovakia at 2010 FIFA World Cup.
First international playing at a CAN: Fernando Varela, with Cape Verde at 2013 Africa Cup of Nations.

Transfers

Record transfer fees paid

Record transfer fees received

Managerial records

First manager: Ioan Sdrobiş, from 20 July 2002 to 1 December 2002.
 Longest-serving manager by matches: Viorel Hizo managed the club for 96 matches over a period of 2 years and 329 days.

Managerial history

Statistics in Liga I

Club records

Matches

Firsts
First match: Vaslui 1–1 Poli Unirea Iaşi, a friendly match, 10 August 2002.
First Football League match: Viitorul Hârlău 1–3 Vaslui, Divizia C, 31 August 2002.
First Romanian Cup match: Vaslui 4–0 FCM CFR Paşcani, 3rd round, 11 September 2002.
First European match: Neftchi Baku 2–1 Vaslui, Intertoto Uefa Cup, 3rd round, 19 July 2008.

Wins
Record league win: 9–0 against Ceahlăul Piatra Neamţ II in Divizia C, 3 May 2003.
Record European Cup win: 3–1 against Liepājas Metalurgs, 28 August 2008.
Most league wins in a season: 22 wins out of 34 games (during the 2011–12 season).
Fewest league wins in a season: 6 wins out of 30 games (during the 2005–06 season).

Defeats
Record defeat: 0–4 against Steaua București in Divizia A, 7 June 2006.
Record defeat at Municipal: 0–4 against Steaua București in Divizia A, 7 June 2006.
Most league defeats in a season: 13 defeats out of 30 games (during the 2005–06 season).
Fewest defeats in a season: 4 defeats out of 30 games 2004–05 season.

Goals
Most league goals scored in a season: 76 in 28 games (during the 2002–03 season, Divizia C).
Fewest league goals scored in a season: 23 in 30 games (during the 2005–06 season, Divizia A).
Most league goals conceded in a season: 44 in 34 games (during the 2006–07 season, Liga I).
Fewest league goals conceded in a season: 15 in 28 games (during the 2002–03 season, Divizia C).

Points
Most points in a season: Three points for a win: 70 (in 34 games in 2011–12, Liga I).
Fewest points in a season::Three points for a win: 29 (in 30 games in 2005–06, Divizia A).

Attendances

Highest league attendance: 12,000 (against Steaua București, Divizia A in the 2005–06 season).
Highest Romanian Cup attendance: 7,000 (against FC Brașov, in the 2009–10 season).
Highest European attendance: 9,000 (against AEK Athens, in the 2009–10 season).
Record lowest attendance: 1,000 (against Gloria Buzău, Divizia B in the 2003–04 season).
Lowest European attendance: 5,000 (against Neftchi Baku in the 2008–09 season).

European record 

Notes for the abbreviations in the tables below:

 1R: First round
 3R: Third round
 2QR: Second qualifying round
 3QR: Third qualifying round
 PO: Play-off round

References

FC Vaslui
FC Vaslui